Chris Baryomunsi (born 9 December 1969) is a Ugandan physician, public health specialist, demographer, and politician. He is the Minister for ICT and National Guidance in the Cabinet of Uganda. He was appointed to that position in 2021. From 1 March 2015 until 6 June 2016, he served as State Minister of Health for General Duties.

Baryomunsi is the elected member of Parliament for Kinkizi County East and a member of Uganda's ruling party, the National Resistance Movement.

Early life and education
Baryomunsi was born in Murama Village, Nyakishenyi, Rukungiri District, to the late Aloysius Mpungirehe and the late Rosaria Kamayangi.

In 1971, when Chris was two years old, his parents migrated to Kayungwe, Rugyeyo in present-day Kanungu District. Baryomunsi attended Kayungwe Primary School for his primary education and St. Paul's Seminary, Kabale for his O-Level and A-Level education. He was admitted to Makerere University, the largest public university in Uganda, to study human medicine. In 1995, he graduated with a Bachelor of Medicine and Bachelor of Surgery degree. In 1997, he was awarded the Postgraduate Diploma in demography, and in 1998 he received a Master of Arts in demography, all from Makerere. In 2003, he received the Postgraduate Diploma in HIV/AIDS Management from the University of Brighton. In 2016, he obtained a PhD in Public Health majoring in Maternal Health from Atlantic International University, USA.

Medical career
From 1995 until 1998, he worked as a medical officer at Mulago Hospital. From 1999 to 2002, he worked as a reproductive health adviser for Deutsche Gesellschaft für Internationale Zusammenarbeit. He later worked as a reproductive health adviser for UNFPA between 2002 and 2006. He also worked as a lecturer at Makerere University between 2000 and 2006.

Political career
Baryomunsi began his political career in high school, where he served as the elected minister for education at St. Paul's Seminary from 1988 to 1990. While at Makerere University in the early 1990s, he was the finance secretary for the Federation of African Medical Students' Association and the secretary for finance for the Makerere University Medical Students’ Association. In 2005, he was appointed as a United Nations Population Fund HIV/AIDS Advisor for Harare. He turned down the job so that he could contest in the 2006 Ugandan parliamentary election. He ran as the NRM political party candidate for the Kinkiizi County East constituency in Kanungu District and was elected to Parliament. He was also elected president of the African Parliamentarians Forum on Population and Development. While in Parliament, he served on the Social Services Committee and has served on the Health and HIV/AIDS Committees to date. He also has served as a Parliamentary Commissioner for NRM in the Parliament of Uganda from June 2011 to April 2014. On 1 March 2015, he was appointed as State Minister of Health for General Duties. On 6 June 2016, he was appointed State Minister for Housing.

Other considerations
He is known to be an independent thinker, who is not afraid to disagree with his party when it diverts "from pro-people issues".

Previously, he has served in the following capacities:
 Vice chairperson of HIV/AIDS  and Health Committees, in the Parliament
 Chairman of the board of directors of the AIDS Information Centre
 Technical advisor on HIV and AIDS, GTZ
 Programme advisor, United Nations Population Fund
 Member of the Parliamentary Budget Committee
 President of the African Parliamentarians Forum on Population and Development
 President, Rotary Club of Kabarole

Personal details
A Mukiga by ethnicity, he was born and raised in a Roman Catholic family. His father converted to Catholicism in the early 1950s, despite having been raised in a Protestant household.

Baryomunsi is married to Fosca Twebaze and they have two children.

Articles, Interviews & Publications
  SAHARA-J: Journal of Social Aspects of HIV/AIDS
  Uganda Draws Back from the AIDS Brink
  Chris Baryomunsi (Uganda), Habitat III, 4th Plenary meeting

See also
Nakaseke District
Kanungu District

References

External links
 Website of the Parliament of Uganda
Website of the Federation of African Medical Students' Associations: The FAMSA Network
Website of Makerere University Medical Students Association (MUMSA)

Living people
1969 births
Members of the Parliament of Uganda
National Resistance Movement politicians
People from Kanungu District
Makerere University alumni
Alumni of the University of Brighton
People from Western Region, Uganda
Government ministers of Uganda
Ugandan public health doctors
HIV/AIDS activists
21st-century Ugandan politicians